Korenev (from корень meaning root) is a Russian masculine surname, its feminine counterpart is Koreneva. It may refer to
Ilya Korenev (born 1995), Russian ice hockey player
Vladimir Korenev (1940-2020), Russian film and theater actor 
Yelena Koreneva (born 1953), Russian actress

Russian-language surnames